"Infinite..." is the second single by Japanese singer Beni Arashiro. It served as the outro theme for TBS's "Count Down TV" in October 2004.

Track listing 
 Infinite...
 Flower on the Earth
 Eternal Flame (The Bangles cover)
 Infinite... (Instrumental)
 Flower on the Earth (Instrumental)

Charts
Oricon Sales Chart (Japan)

References

Beni (singer) songs
2004 singles
2004 songs
Avex Trax singles